Eratoneura is a genus of leafhoppers in the family Cicadellidae. There are at least 190 described species in Eratoneura.

See also
 List of Eratoneura species

References

Further reading

External links

 

Cicadellidae genera
Erythroneurini